Ascrea is a  (municipality) in the Province of Rieti in the Italian region of Latium, located about  northeast of Rome and about  southeast of Rieti.

Geography
It is an agricultural centre in the middle valley of the }. The municipality borders with Castel di Tora, Collegiove, Longone Sabino, Marcetelli, Paganico Sabino, Pozzaglia Sabina, Rocca Sinibalda and Varco Sabino.

The municipal territory includes a northern exclave in which are located its hamlets: Stipes and Valleverde Stipes. A southeastern exclave is located few kilometers from the town.

References

External links

Cities and towns in Lazio